Çitli can refer to:

 Çitli, Gümüşhacıköy
 Çitli, Mecitözü